San Pedro Junior College was established in 2000 to offer tertiary-level education opportunities in San Pedro, Belize.
The motto for the school is "Anchor In Success".

Programs
 Business Administration w/c Accounting
 Business Management
 General Science
 Marine Biology
 Tourism Management

References

Universities in Belize
Educational institutions established in 2000
2000 establishments in Belize